Season 2003–04 was the 120th football season in which Dumbarton competed at a Scottish national level, entering the Scottish Football League for the 98th time, the Scottish Cup for the 109th time, the Scottish League Cup for the 57th time and the Scottish Challenge Cup for the 13th time.

Overview 
Notwithstanding the improvement in performances towards the end of the previous season, manager David Winnie set about a considerable change in playing staff.  Unfortunately, despite an initial burst,  it would take longer than expected for the new players to settle in, and by the end of October, only one league win had been recorded. However, from then until the end of the season, the league campaign saw a vast improvement in results and in the end a 3rd-place finish was achieved - missing promotion by just 2 points.

In the Scottish Cup, it would be a first round exit for the third season in a row, with a heavy defeat to Gretna.

In the League Cup, following a win over Ayr United in the first round, it would be Premier Division Aberdeen that would bring Dumbarton's interest in the competition to an end.

Finally, in the Scottish Challenge Cup, it was back to old habits, with Ross County handing out a first round thumping.

Locally, in the Stirlingshire Cup, Dumbarton lost both of their opening group ties - however each tie was lost on a penalty shoot out.

Results & fixtures

Scottish Second Division

Bell's Challenge Cup

CIS League Cup

Scottish Cup

Stirlingshire Cup

Pre-season and mid-season friendlies

League table

Player statistics

Squad 

|}

Transfers

Players in

Players out

Trivia
 The League match against Forfar Athletic on 20 September marked Craig Brittain's 200th appearance for Dumbarton in all national competitions - the 28th Dumbarton player to break the 'double century'.

See also
 2003–04 in Scottish football

References

External links
Kris Robertson (Dumbarton Football Club Historical Archive)
John Wight (Dumbarton Football Club Historical Archive) 
Steve Laidler (Dumbarton Football Club Historical Archive)
Danny Smith (Dumbarton Football Club Historical Archive)
Gordon Herd (Dumbarton Football Club Historical Archive)
Scottish Football Historical Archive

Dumbarton F.C. seasons
Scottish football clubs 2003–04 season